Largo, located within greater Upper Marlboro, Maryland, is an unincorporated area and census-designated place in Prince George's County, Maryland, United States. The population was 11,605 at the 2020 census.

Largo is located just east of the Capital Beltway (I-95/495) and is home to Prince George's Community College and Largo High School. Six Flags America amusement park (formerly known as Wild World and Adventure World) is to the east in Woodmore, and FedExField, the Washington Commanders's stadium, is across the Capital Beltway in Summerfield. Watkins Regional Park in Kettering just to the east of Largo (operated by the Maryland-National Capital Park and Planning Commission) has an old-fashioned carousel, miniature train ride, miniature golf, the Old Maryland Farm, a playground, and animals on display. Largo is not a post office designation, but is at the northern end of the Greater Upper Marlboro ZIP code area.

Since the transit system's expansion in late 2004, Largo Town Center has served as the eastern end of the Blue and Silver Lines of the Washington Metro.

History
Largo was named after the Largo Plantation that was owned by the Beall family. The plantation is believed to be named after Largo Bay in Scotland. It was sold to John Contee in 1745.

Arelis R. Hernández of The Washington Post stated in 2015 that "There has been talk for decades of relocating the [Prince George's County] government to Largo". In 2015 Rushern Baker, the county executive, expressed a desire to move the county seat from Upper Marlboro to Largo since the latter has a more central location and access to the Washington Metro network. A spokesperson for Thomas V. Mike Miller Jr., the President of the Maryland Senate, expressed opposition to this idea.

Transportation 
The WMATA (Washington Area Transit Authority), Blue and Silver Lines eastern terminus is Largo Town Centre Station. Largo Town Center Station is served by several regional bus routes operated by both WMATA and Prince Georges County's The Bus.

Geography
Largo is located at  (38.876850, −76.830651).

Demographics

2020 census

Note: the US Census treats Hispanic/Latino as an ethnic category. This table excludes Latinos from the racial categories and assigns them to a separate category. Hispanics/Latinos can be of any race.

2000 Census
As of the census of 2000, there were 8,408 people, 3,471 households, and 2,127 families residing in the CDP. The racial makeup of the CDP was 4.27% White, 92.69% African American, 0.13% Native American, 0.78% Asian, 0.04% Pacific Islander, 0.51% from other races, and 1.58% from two or more races. Hispanic or Latino of any race were 1.43% of the population.

There were 3,471 households, out of which 31.7% had children under the age of 18 living with them, 34.3% were married couples living together, 22.4% had a female householder with no husband present, and 38.7% were non-families. Of all households 31.9% were made up of individuals, and 3.3% had someone living alone who was 65 years of age or older. The average household size was 2.41 and the average family size was 3.09.

In the CDP, the population was spread out, with 25.3% under the age of 18, 8.4% from 18 to 24, 35.9% from 25 to 44, 25.7% from 45 to 64, and 4.7% who were 65 years of age or older. The median age was 34 years. For every 100 females, there were 79.4 males. For every 100 females age 18 and over, there were 73.7 males.

The median income for a household in the CDP was $58,130, and the median income for a family was $70,421. Males had a median income of $40,067 versus $37,417 for females. The per capita income for the CDP was $26,312. About 3.2% of families and 5.3% of the population were below the poverty line, including 7.6% of those under age 18 and 6.5% of those age 65 or over.

Government and infrastructure
Even though the county seat is in Upper Marlboro, multiple agencies of the Government of Prince George's County, including the majority of the county's executive branch, reside in Largo. In the 1990s the PG County government purchased some properties and leased others, and county administrative functions were moved to Largo. Circa 2010, five PG County agencies were headquartered in these properties in Largo. Beginning in 2011, four additional county agencies relocated to Largo, and the county government acquired at least eight parcels of land and/or buildings.  County Executive Baker held his "Citizen Day" in Largo instead of Upper Marlboro.

Prince George's County Police Department District 2 Station in Brock Hall CDP, with a Bowie postal address, serves the community.

The U.S. Postal Service operates the Largo Post Office in Lake Arbor CDP, with a Largo postal address.

Education

Primary and secondary schools
Largo is a part of the Prince George's County Public Schools. Residents are divided between Arrowhead, Kettering, and Lake Arbor elementary schools. Most areas are zoned to Kettering Middle School while some are zoned to Ernest Everett Just Middle School. All areas in Largo are zoned to Largo High School.

Divine Peace Lutheran School is a K-8 Christian school of the Wisconsin Evangelical Lutheran Synod in Largo.

High Road Upper School, Largo MD

Post-secondary education
The community is also home to Prince George's Community College, serving a county population of 850,000 residents.

Public libraries
Largo is served by the Largo-Kettering Branch of the Prince George's County Memorial Library System (PGCMLS) and is the headquarters location for PGCMLS. The library headquarters, previously adjacent to the Hyattsville Branch, moved to Largo in 2015.

Notable people
 Wale Folarin, Rapper
Usama Young, Former American football safety
 Oddisee, Rapper
 Albert Wynn, former Congressman.
 Q Da Fool, rapper
Rico Nasty, rapper
Tramell Tillman, actor
redveil, rapper

References

External links 

 

Census-designated places in Maryland
Census-designated places in Prince George's County, Maryland
Washington metropolitan area
Levittown